Lindsey Kelk is a bestselling British author, journalist and formerly worked as a children's book editor. She was initially signed up to a three-book deal by publishers HarperCollins following the submission of a manuscript for her first novel. To date, she has published 17 adult books and is also the author of the children's book series, Cinders and Sparks. She lives in Los Angeles, California.

Career
Kelk was inspired to write her first book, I heart New York, after returning from a holiday to New York City to her home in London, England, and being unable to get over post-vacation blues. She immediately decided that it would be a series of books, each taking in different cities, partly inspired by her teen experience of reading the Sweet Valley High series of novels. She found an agent through a roundabout route; having sent out copies of I Heart New York to various agents and having received several rejection letters, one agent got in contact with Kelk. However, it transpired that the agent disliked the book and wanted her to work on a different project, and that she "would have to use a pseudonym because [her] name sounded like a cat being sick". Kelk decided not to sign with the agent and instead asked a friend who worked with book publisher HarperCollins to recommend one. The friend handed a copy of the book to the commercial women's fiction team, who signed her to a three-book deal.

Kelk writes a blog on her website and has written for many women's magazines, including a monthly column for magazine Marie Claire. In 2009 she moved with her full-time job as a children's book editor to New York itself, something she said was following in the footsteps of the lead character from her book series. She currently works as a full-time writer.

In 2017, Kelk started the beauty podcast, Full Coverage, along with co-host Harriet Hadfield, a British makeup artist and YouTuber, also based in Los Angeles. She is also one of the hosts of popular pro-wrestling podcast, Tights and Fights.

After a visit to the Canadian side of Niagara Falls during a road trip in 2010, she decided to write the location into one of her books. I heart Hollywood was nominated for the People's Choice Award in the inaugural Pure Passion Awards in 2010, an awards ceremony set up by the Romantic Novelists' Association. At the following year's awards, I Heart Paris was nominated for Romantic Comedy Novel of the Year.

Her novel, I Heart Christmas, spent two weeks on The Sunday Times bestseller list in December 2013.

Personal life

Married Jeff Israel 27 September 2019.

Her favourite book of all time is The Secret History by Donna Tartt. She previously lived in Williamsburg and Park Slope, Brooklyn but moved to Los Angeles in 2015. She has two cats and is a big fan of professional wrestling.

Bibliography

I Heart Series
 I Heart New York (2009)
 I Heart Hollywood (2010)
 I Heart Paris (2010)
 I Heart Vegas (2012)
 I Heart London (2012)
 I Heart Christmas (2013)
 I Heart Forever (2017)
 I Heart Hawaii (2019)

Tess Brookes Series
 About A Girl (2013)
 What a Girl Wants (2014)
 A Girl's Best Friend (2015)

Jenny Lopez Series
 Jenny Lopez Has A Bad Week (2011)
 Jenny Lopez Saves Christmas (2014)

Singles
 The Single Girl's To Do List (2011)
 Always The Bridesmaid (2015)
 We Were On A Break (2016)
 One in a Million (2018)
 In Case You Missed It (2020)
 On a Night Like This (2021)

Cinder and Sparks Series
Cinders and Sparks: Magic at Midnight (2019)
Cinders and Sparks: Fairies in the Forest (2019)

References

British chick lit writers
1980 births
People from Doncaster
English writers
Living people
English women novelists